Miika Töyräs (born 5 June 1999) is a Finnish professional footballer who plays as a goalkeeper.

Career

Club career
On 11 November 2019 KPV confirmed, that Töyräs would join the club from the 2020 season, signing a one-year deal.

References

External links
Miika Töyräs at Palloliitto

1999 births
Living people
Finnish footballers
Kuopion Palloseura players
SC Kuopio Futis-98 players
Mikkelin Palloilijat players
Kokkolan Palloveikot players
Veikkausliiga players
Kakkonen players
Association football goalkeepers
Sportspeople from Jyväskylä
21st-century Finnish people